The Gym Dandies is the largest children's circus in New England.  Located in Scarborough, Maine, the program is an extracurricular activity for any children in grades three through twelve who wish to participate.

Mission statement 
This is the Gym Dandies' mission statement, according to their website:

"'The Gym Dandies' is not about winning or [losing].  The primary goal of this program is to help children develop motor skills, confidence, and self-esteem in a noncompetitive atmosphere.  Ultimately, participants will apply their skills cooperatively in performances for the purpose of entertainment."

Performances

Parades 
The group generally only does performances around New England, especially in the states of Maine and New Hampshire, however they have also been to the National Independence Day Parade three times (2000 2004,2006 and 2011),  the Montreal Bicycle Festival (2002), the Macy's Thanksgiving Day Parade (2005), the National Cherry Blossom Festival Parade (2008 and 2012). Most recently the group was invited to participate in the 2013 Presidential Inaugural Day Parade in Washington D.C. (2013). The Gym Dandies were also an annual participant in the Maine State Parade until it was cancelled.  The children's circus has also been featured twice on the PBS show, Zoom.

Community performances 
Many times, the Gym Dandies will visit other schools around New England to give lessons and community performances. They often leave a lasting impression, and many schools are motivated to start their own circus arts program. In addition to this, there is an annual performance for the town of Scarborough.

Equipment 
A list of the circus arts equipment that the group uses in its performances:
Unicycles
"Giraffes" ( unicycles)
Juggling balls, clubs, and rings
Diabolos
Yo-yos
Devil sticks
 Walking Globes, 24" to 30" high, on which children balance, walk, while jumping rope/juggling)
Spinning plates
 Chinese Stilts
 Slack hope

History 
The Gym Dandies" Children’s Circus of Scarborough, Maine came into existence when Jon Cahill, the director of this group, began incorporating circus skills into the physical education program.  Mr. Cahill soon realized that circus arts had the potential to be much more than just an alternate activity in the physical education curriculum.  There were numerous potential benefits that could be realized by children as a result of participating in this unusual, challenging, and exciting endeavor. But, something was missing.  The children loved to demonstrate their skills. They wanted to perform, and this was the birth of "The Gym Dandies".

In 1981, "The Gym Dandies", the little "Big Top" of Scarborough, consisted of ten enthusiastic fifth and sixth grade boys and girls and a box full of tennis balls.  Circus arts are naturally motivating for children at this age and soon it became obvious that juggling, although challenging, was not enough.  "The Gym Dandies" held what might have been the "World’s First Juggle -A-Thon" in the spring of 1981.  Funds raised from the Juggle-A-Thon went toward the purchase of unicycles.  By the spring of 1982, after a great deal of hard work,  “The Gym Dandies" had evolved into a stylized unicycling and juggling group normally found only in professional circuses.

Approximately 230 children now participate each school year. There are beginner and advanced groups and each member meets once a week to practice. The age range of participants is 8 to 18 years old.  Well over 4,000 Scarborough, Maine school children have participated in the Gym Dandies circus arts program since 1981.

External links 
 

Circuses
Scarborough, Maine